North Carolina Highway 80 (NC 80) is a primary state highway in the U.S. state of North Carolina.  The highway connects the various mountain communities straddled along Buck Creek, South Toe River and North Toe River in Western North Carolina and serves as a direct route, via the Blue Ridge Parkway, to Mount Mitchell State Park.

Route description

NC 80 is a  two-lane mountain highway between US 70, in Pleasant Gardens, and NC 226A, near Bakersville.  The highway is popular with bike and motorcycle enthusiasts, because of its hairpin turns and also makes up part of the Mount Mitchell Scenic Drive between the Blue Ridge Parkway and Micaville.  Trucks are not recommended to take NC 80, with multiple warning signs posted at each major intersection.

In McDowell County, NC 80 begins in the Pleasant Gardens community, located west of Marion.  Going north, it soon arrives at Lake Tahoma, built in 1924, a private lake which has a notable stone building situated in it, connected by causeway.  Soon after leaving the western shores of the lake, the highway hugs along Buck Creek to the Sunnyvale community, where it then begins its ascent up Singecat Ridge.  The following  has numerous 180-degree turns and is recommended to drive carefully along this section.  At Buck Creek Gap, NC 80 connects with the Blue Ridge Parkway, where travelers may continue on their way towards Mount Mitchell State Park; the location also features an overlook and is where both the Eastern Continental Divide and the Yancey County line cross.

From Buck Creek Gap, NC 80 descends into the Busick community and then along the South Toe River.  Near Hamrick is the Carolina Hemlocks Recreation Area, part of the Pisgah National Forest, where visitors can hike nearby trails and camp.   further downstream is Celo Community, located at the base of Celo Knob.  In Micaville, NC 80 connects with US 19E, where travelers can continue on towards Burnsville or Spruce Pine.  After a  overlap with US 19E, NC 80 continues north into Mitchell County.

After crossing the North Toe River, NC 80 becomes windy as it hugs along Ellis, Gouge and Burnt Mountains.  Both Kona and Lunday are found along the banks of the North Toe River here; while Bandana, known for its local pottery, is situated along Sink Hole Creek.  At NC 226A (Mine Creek Road), NC 80 ends; continuing north along NC 226A goes to Loafers Glory and NC 80's pre-1996 northern terminus.  Both directions on NC 226A will take travelers on to Bakersville.

History
The first NC 80 was established in 1921 and traveled from South Carolina to Virginia, via Wadesboro, Albemarle, Salisbury, Mocksville and Mount Airy.  In 1926, NC 80 was duplex with NC 20 in Wadesboro.  By 1929, NC 80 was realigned to go through Rockwell.  In 1934, most of NC 80 was replaced by US 52, from South Carolina to Salisbury, and US 601, from Salisbury to Mount Airy; only the part northeast of Mount Airy to the Virginia state line remained.  In 1940, the remaining section was renumbered as NC 103.

The second and current NC 80 was established in 1940 as a renumbering of NC 104, between US 64/US 70, in Pleasant Gardens, to NC 26, in Loafers Glory.  In 1970, NC 80 was realigned onto improved roadway to US 19E, near Micaville; the old alignment along Stream Road (SR 1425) was consequently downgraded.  In 1996, NC 80 was truncated at Mine Creek Road, near Bakersville, upon the establishment of NC 226A along it, which also replaced its former routing to Loafers Glory.

Major intersections

References

External links

 
 NCRoads.com: N.C. 80

080
Transportation in McDowell County, North Carolina
Transportation in Yancey County, North Carolina
Transportation in Mitchell County, North Carolina